Sabunçu or Sabunchu or Sabyncha or Sabynchy or Sabunchy may refer to:
 Sabunçu, Baku, Azerbaijan
 Sabunçu, Zaqatala, Azerbaijan
 Sabunçu raion, Azerbaijan